The Essex murders may refer to several murders in the county of Essex, England:

 Babes in the Wood murders (Epping Forest), 1970 murder of two children 
 White House Farm murders, 1985 murder of Bamber family members
 Rettendon murders, 1995 murder of three drug dealers in a Range Rover
 2014 Colchester murders, by 15-year-old James Fairweather